Buckskins are clothing, usually consisting of a jacket and leggings, made from buckskin, a soft sueded leather from the hide of deer. Buckskins are often trimmed with a fringe – originally a functional detail, to allow the garment to shed rain, and to dry faster when wet because the fringe acted as a series of wicks to disperse the water – or quills. They also served as a form of camouflage when hunting, by breaking up the outline of the wearer and allowing them to blend in with their background.

Buckskins derive from deerskin clothing worn by Native Americans. They were popular with mountain men and other frontiersmen for their warmth and durability. Buckskin jackets, often dyed and elaborately detailed, are a staple of western wear and were a brief fad in the 1970s. The American jacket/tunic known as a wamus was originally made from buckskin with fringe.

Famous wearers 

Annie Oakley
Buffalo Bill
Calamity Jane
Davy Crockett
George Armstrong Custer
Sitting Bull
Wild Bill Hickok
Tommy Seebach
Theodore Roosevelt
 Metis people
Seth Kinman
Charles Manson

References

External links 

Native American clothing
Suits (clothing)
Western wear
Fur trade
Mountain men
1970s fashion
Western (genre) staples and terminology